Mua'dh or Moath or Muaz  is a male Arabic given name. Notable people with the name include:  

Muadh ibn Jabal (603–639), companion of the prophet Muhammad
Sa'd ibn Mu'adh ( 590-627), companion of the prophet Muhammad

Arabic masculine given names